Raegan LaRochelle is an American politician from the state of Maine. She is a member of the Augusta City Council, and a member-elect to the Maine House of Representatives.

LaRochelle took office as the at-large councillor on the Augusta city council in January 2020. She ran in the special election to succeed Justin Fecteau, a Republican in the 86th district, and defeated James Orr, a Republican, in the election on November 2, 2021.

Electoral history

References

Year of birth missing (living people)
Living people
Politicians from Augusta, Maine
Democratic Party members of the Maine House of Representatives
Maine city council members
Women city councillors in Maine
Women state legislators in Maine